Titusville Historic District is a national historic district in Titusville, Crawford County, Pennsylvania.

The district includes 472 contributing buildings in the central business district and surrounding residential areas. It includes a mix of residential, commercial, industrial, and institutional buildings with the majority built after the Drake Well was established in 1859. They are in a variety of popular architectural styles including Greek Revival, Italianate, Queen Anne, and Colonial Revival.

Notable buildings include the William Barnsdell House (c. 1855), First National Bank, R.D. Fletcher's Store, Universalist Church (1865), The Corinthian Hall, Chase and Stewart Block, Kernochan and Company Building (c. 1900), Penn Movie Theater (1939), Pennsylvania Bank & Trust Co., Swedish Congregationalist Church, and the Emerson House. Located in the district and separately listed is the Titusville City Hall.

The district was added to the National Register of Historic Places in 1985.

References

Historic districts on the National Register of Historic Places in Pennsylvania
Greek Revival architecture in Pennsylvania
Italianate architecture in Pennsylvania
Queen Anne architecture in Pennsylvania
Colonial Revival architecture in Pennsylvania
Buildings and structures in Crawford County, Pennsylvania
Titusville, Pennsylvania
National Register of Historic Places in Crawford County, Pennsylvania
1985 establishments in Pennsylvania